Chen Yu-Cheng (born 6 October 1992, in Taipei City) is a Taiwanese male archer. At the 2012 Summer Olympics he competed for his country in the Men's team event.

Yu-cheng secured a spot on the Chinese Taipei team for the 2020 Tokyo Olympic Games. He performed well at three selection tournaments that took place prior to the Olympics.

Unfortunately, he was not able to attain a medal.

References

Taiwanese male archers
1992 births
Living people
Olympic archers of Taiwan
Archers at the 2012 Summer Olympics
21st-century Taiwanese people